Greenhouse is a surname. Notable people with the surname include:

Bernard Greenhouse (1916–2011), American cellist
Bunny Greenhouse, American civil servant and whistleblower
Isaiah Greenhouse (born 1987), American football player
Linda Greenhouse (born 1947), American journalist
Martha Greenhouse (1921–2013), American actress
Samuel Greenhouse (1918–2000), American statistician
Steven Greenhouse, American journalist